DP3T can mean:

 a double pole, triple throw switch, see switch#Contact terminology
 the Decentralized Privacy-Preserving Proximity Tracing protocol